This is a list of notable events in Latin music (i.e. Spanish- and Portuguese-speaking music from Latin America, Latin Europe, and the United States) that took place in 2006.

Events
November 3 — The 7th Annual Latin Grammy Awards are held at the Madison Square Garden in New York City, New York.
Shakira is the biggest winner receiving four awards including Album of the Year for Fijación Oral, Vol. 1 and Record of the Year and Song of the Year for "La Tortura" featuring Alejandro Sanz.
Calle 13 wins Best New Artist.

Number-ones albums and singles by country
List of number-one singles of 2006 (Spain)
List of number-one Billboard Top Latin Albums of 2006
List of number-one Billboard Hot Latin Songs of 2006

Awards
2006 Premio Lo Nuestro
2006 Billboard Latin Music Awards
2006 Latin Grammy Awards
2006 Tejano Music Awards

Albums released

First quarter

January

February

March

Second quarter

April

May

June

Third quarter

July

August

September

Fourth quarter

October

November

December

Dates unknown

Best-selling records

Best-selling albums
The following is a list of the top 10 best-selling Latin albums in the United States in 2006, according to Billboard.

Best-performing songs
The following is a list of the top 10 best-performing Latin songs in the United States in 2006, according to Billboard.

Deaths

References 

 
Latin music by year